Slavko Rodić (Sredice near Ključ, 7 July 1914 - Belgrade, 29 April 1949),  was a Yugoslav partisan, general of Yugoslav People's Army and People's Hero of Yugoslavia.

Prior to April War, Rodić worked as surveyor for Royal Yugoslav Army in Vršac. After Yugoslav defeat, he returned to Krajina. There he joined local communist in their preparation for uprising against Independent State of Croatia and Axis occupation.

During 1943 and 1943, he was commander of 5th Krajina Division, and then 5th Bosnian Corps. He was promoted to major general in 1943, at age 27, thus becoming the youngest general of People's Liberation Army.

After death of General Arso Jovanović in 1948 was promoted to deputy chief of staff of Yugoslav Army HQ. However, he too died soon, on 29 April 1949.

References

Further reading
 
 
 

1914 births
1949 deaths
Yugoslav Partisans members
Recipients of the Order of the People's Hero
Generals of the Yugoslav People's Army